LKJ in Dub is an album by the dub poet Linton Kwesi Johnson, released in 1980 on Island Records. It was produced by Dennis Bovell (credited as Blackbeard). It contains dub versions of tracks from the two previous LKJ albums, Forces of Victory and Bass Culture.

Critical reception
Trouser Press called the album "an interesting and successful example of dub technique." The New York Times compared the album to Bovell's recent I Wah Dub, calling LKJ in Dub "a less gimmicky, more emotionally satisfying piece of work." The Boston Globe wrote that "there are some nice grooves here, but with no voice to sing, no soloing instruments, not even a stray Frippertronic to hang onto, it's hard to recommend this album."

Track listing 
All tracks written by Linton Kwesi Johnson

"Victorious Dub" – 3:32
"Reality [dub]" – 2:45
"Peach Dub" – 3:48
"Shocking [dub]" – 4:45
"Iron Bar Dub" – 3:42
"Bitch Dub" – 4:35
"Cultural Dub" – 3:27
"Brain Smashing Dub" – 3:27

Personnel 
Floyd Lawson, Vivian Weathers - bass guitar
Winston Curniffe - drums
Lloyd "Jah Bunny" Donaldson - drums, percussion
John Kpiaye - guitar
Julio Finn - harmonica
Dennis Bovell, Webster Johnson - keyboards
Clinton Bailey, Everard Forrest - percussion
James Danton - alto saxophone
Rico - trombone
Dick Cuthell, Henry "Buttons" Tenyue - trumpet, flugelhorn 
Technical
Dennis Bovell - mixing
Dennis Morris - cover design

References

Island Records albums
1980 albums
Linton Kwesi Johnson albums
Dub albums